Christopher Michael Carr (born February 8, 1972) is an American lawyer and politician. A Republican, he is the current Attorney General of Georgia. In 2016, Governor Nathan Deal appointed Carr as Attorney General to fill a vacancy created by the departure of former Attorney General Sam Olens. Carr was elected to a four-year term in Georgia's 2018 statewide elections. He won a second term in the 2022 Georgia Attorney General election.

Education
Carr graduated from the University of Georgia Terry College of Business with a BBA degree in 1995, and from the University of Georgia School of Law with a Juris Doctor degree in 1999. Carr has been admitted to practice law in Georgia since 1999.

Legal career
After graduating law school, he practiced law with Alston & Bird in Atlanta and later served as Vice President and General Counsel for the Georgia Public Policy Foundation. From 2011 to 2018 he served on the Georgia Judicial Nominating Commission. He also served on the Board of Advisors for the Atlanta Lawyers Chapter of the Federalist Society for Law and Public Policy Studies.

Political career
Carr was Chief of Staff for U.S. Senator Johnny Isakson for six years. From November 2013 to November 2016, Carr was Commissioner of the Georgia Department of Economic Development.

Attorney General of Georgia 
In 2019, Carr joined 17 other Republican Attorneys General in suing to invalidate the Affordable Care Act (ACA), stating, “We believe the Court will uphold our position that the ACA is unconstitutional.”

Carr supported legislation in Georgia to revise voting regulations. Carr was chair of the Republican Attorneys General Association, an organization that sent robocalls on January 6, 2021, urging supporters to march to Washington to dispute the certification of the election results in which Joe Biden won. Carr resigned as chair of the organization in April 2021 over his opposition to the robocall, saying he had a "fundamental difference of opinion” with others in the organization that began with “vastly opposite views of the significance of the events of January 6.”

During his tenure, Carr's office was involved in indicting former member of Georgia's Board of Regents for racketeering, the Paulding County, Ga., District Attorney for bribery, and a former Chief Magistrate Judge in Pickens County, Ga., for financial fraud, as well as indictments of three individuals for elder abuse.

Personal life
He is married to Joan and has two children.

Electoral history

References

External links

1972 births
21st-century American politicians
Georgia (U.S. state) Attorneys General
Living people
Political chiefs of staff
United States congressional aides
University of Georgia School of Law alumni
University of Georgia alumni
Georgia (U.S. state) Republicans